Dale Christopher Stephens (born 12 June 1989) is an English professional footballer who plays as a central midfielder. He is currently a free agent following his release from Burnley.

Early life
Stephens was born in Bolton, Greater Manchester.

Career

Oldham Athletic

Stephens joined Oldham Athletic on 1 July 2008 after rejecting a new deal at Bury. On 9 March 2010, he scored his first goal for Oldham in a 2–0 win over Leyton Orient.

Loans to Rochdale and Southampton
On 14 August 2009, Stephens joined Rochdale on a month's loan. He made his debut in a 3–3 draw with Morecambe on 4 September 2009, where he scored the equaliser. It was later extended by another month. On 12 October he extended the loan spell for a third time.

On 24 March 2011, Stephens signed on loan for Southampton until the end of the season. He made his debut as a substitute in a 3–2 victory over MK Dons. He started days later against Charlton Athletic but had to be stretchered off at the end of the first half.

Charlton Athletic
On 29 June 2011, Stephens signed a three-year contract for Charlton Athletic for an undisclosed fee, estimated to be around £350,000.

Brighton & Hove Albion
On 30 January 2014, Stephens signed a three-and-a-half-year contract with Brighton & Hove Albion for an undisclosed fee. Stephens scored his first goal of the 2015–16 season with a strike against Rotherham United, in a 2–1 win. He followed this up with goals against Bolton Wanderers (2–2 draw), Cardiff (1–1 draw), QPR (2–2 draw), Cardiff (4–1 loss), and Burnley (2–2 draw). He formed a vital partnership with Beram Kayal, and would play an integral part in the side that would go 21 league matches unbeaten.

On 7 May 2016, in an away tie against Middlesbrough with winner takes all to win automatic promotion to the Premier League, Stephens scored a 55th minute equaliser to give Brighton a lifeline as Brighton needed a win to go up. Four minutes after his headed goal, Stephens was sent off for a tackle on Gastón Ramírez. The game finished 1–1, meaning Boro won promotion to the top flight and Stephens' suspension meant he would miss the play-offs in which The Seagulls would lose the two legged semi final to Sheffield Wednesday.

Stephens was a key performer for Brighton throughout the 2016–17 season, helping the club to earn promotion to the Premier League. He signed a new four-year contract with the club in the summer of 2017, with his previous contract set to run out at the conclusion of the season.

Brighton's first match in the top flight for 34 years was at home to eventual champions Manchester City. Stephens played the whole match in the 2–0 defeat on his Premier League debut. He played in Brighton's first ever win in the Premier League in a 3–1 home win over West Brom on 9 September 2017. Stephens scored his first goal of the 2017–18 season on 8 January opening the scoreline in a 2–1 home win against bitter rivals Crystal Palace in the third round of the FA Cup. On 4 May 2018 Stephens played in the match that ensured Brighton Premier League safety with a 1–0 win over Manchester United at Falmer Stadium.

On 10 November 2018 Stephens received his first Premier League red card away against Cardiff. He was sent off at 1–1, it eventually finished 2–1 to The Bluebirds. Stephens scored his first ever Premier League goal away against West Ham opening the scoreline in the 2–2 draw on 2 January 2019. He made 5 FA Cup appearances in the 2018–19 season where The Seagulls made the semi final.

Stephens played in Brighton's first home win of the 2019–20 season which came on the 5 October where Brighton put three past Tottenham and keeping a clean sheet.

Burnley
On 24 September 2020, Burnley announced the signing of Stephens on a two-year deal. Two days after the announcement of his signing he made his debut in what also happened to be his 100th Premier league appearance, starting and playing the whole match in the 1–0 home defeat against his former club Southampton.

He made his first appearance of the 2021–22 season on 30 December, coming on as a substitute in the 3–1 away loss at Manchester United. Stephens made his first start of the season on 8 January 2022, starting and playing 82 minutes of the eventual 2–1 FA Cup third round home loss against Huddersfield of the Championship. He made his first Premier League start in over a year on 5 February, playing the whole match of the frustrating 0–0 home draw against Watford. On 10 June, Burnley announced that Stephens would leave the club at the end of the month when his contract expired.

Career statistics

Honours
Charlton Athletic
Football League One: 2011–12

Brighton & Hove Albion
EFL Championship runner-up: 2016–17

References

External links

Profile at the Brighton & Hove Albion F.C. website

1989 births
Living people
Footballers from Bolton
English footballers
Association football midfielders
Bury F.C. players
Droylsden F.C. players
Hyde United F.C. players
Oldham Athletic A.F.C. players
Rochdale A.F.C. players
Southampton F.C. players
Charlton Athletic F.C. players
Brighton & Hove Albion F.C. players
Burnley F.C. players
English Football League players
National League (English football) players
Premier League players